Nine ships of the Royal Navy have borne the name HMS Pioneer:
  was a 14-gun brig listed 1804–1807.
  was a Pigmy–class schooner of the Royal Navy, launched in 1810 as a cutter. During her service with the Navy she captured one French privateer and assisted at the capture of another. In 1823–1824 she underwent fitting for the Coast Guard blockade. She then served with the Coast Guard to 1845. She was sold at Plymouth in 1849.
  was a wood screw discovery vessel launched in 1850. She was originally named Eider. She was abandoned in 1854 in the Arctic.
  was a wood screw gunvessel launched in 1856. She was broken up in 1865.
  was a wood paddle survey vessel built in 1860, transferred from the Colonial Office in 1864. She was sold in 1873.
  was a composite paddle vessel launched in 1874. She was broken up in 1888.
  was a river gunboat launched in 1892. In 1893 she was dismantled and then re-erected in Lake Nyasa. She was transferred to the British Central Africa government in 1894.
 HMS Pioneer was a  light cruiser launched in 1899. She was transferred to the Royal Australian Navy in 1912 where she became .
  was a  launched in 1944. She was originally named Ethalion, then Mars. She was broken up in 1954.

See also
, a gunboat commissioned by New Zealand and manned by the Royal Navy

References

 McDougall, R J (1989) New Zealand Naval Vessels. Government Printing Office. 

Royal Navy ship names